Kateryna Volodymyrivna Klymiuk (born 2 June 1995) is a Ukrainian sprinter. She competed in the women's 4 × 400 metres relay at the 2017 World Championships in Athletics. She also competed in the mixed 4 × 400 metres relay event at the 2020 Summer Olympics.

References

External links
 

1995 births
Living people
Ukrainian female sprinters
World Athletics Championships athletes for Ukraine
Place of birth missing (living people)
Athletes (track and field) at the 2020 Summer Olympics
Olympic athletes of Ukraine
Sportspeople from Rivne
20th-century Ukrainian women
21st-century Ukrainian women
Universiade medalists in athletics (track and field)
Universiade gold medalists for Ukraine